David Ackroyd (born May 30, 1940) is an American actor, who first came to prominence in soap operas such as The Secret Storm and Another World.

Early life 
On May 30, 1940, Ackroyd was born in East Orange, New Jersey; he moved to Wayne, New Jersey, when he was 12 years old.

Career

David Ackroyd extended his all-stage career into film and television in the early 1970s, beginning with daytime leading man outings in The Secret Storm and Another World. He progressed to work as Gary Ewing in Dallas until Ted Shackelford successfully took over the role when the character moved to the spin-off drama Knots Landing. Ackroyd later appeared on Knots Landing as a guest star, playing a different character.

In the late 1970s, he appeared in the miniseries The Dark Secret of Harvest Home as Nick Constantine; The Word and the TV movies And I Alone Survived and Exo-Man. He costarred in the short-lived series AfterMASH and A Peaceable Kingdom. He had supporting roles in  The Mountain Men, Dark Angel and Xena: Warrior Princess. He voiced "John Cavanaugh/Prince Corran of Dar-Shan" in the animated series Wildfire as well as several characters in The New Yogi Bear Show, The Greatest Adventure: Stories from the Bible, The Real Adventures of Jonny Quest and The New Adventures of Captain Planet.

On Broadway, Ackroyd appeared in Unlikely Heroes, a 1971 production of three plays based on the stories of Philip Roth; and Children of a Lesser God, in which he replaced John Rubinstein as the lead character James Leeds in 1981. Since the late 1990s and into the 2000s, Ackroyd has narrated documentaries on TV, including History's Mysteries and UFO Files: "Alien Engineering".

Ackroyd moved to Montana in 1996. In 2003, he co-founded the Alpine Theatre Project in Whitefish, a professional acting company, where he is the artistic development director. The project has featured appearances by Olympia Dukakis, John Lithgow and Kelli O'Hara.

Filmography

Actor
 1971-1974 The Secret Storm as Kevin Kincade
 1974-1977 Another World as Dr. Dave Gilchrist
 1975 Kojak as Vincent Hackley
 1977 Exo-Man as Dr. Nicholas Conrad / Exo-Man
 1978 Lou Grant as Mike Kessler
 1978 The Dark Secret of Harvest Home as Nick Constantine
 1978 The Word as Tom Carey
 1978 Dallas as Gary Ewing
 1978 And I Alone Survived as Jay Fuller
 1978 The Paper Chase, Season 1, Episode 5: "Voices of Silence"  as Eric Ryerson
 1978 Little Women as Professor Friedrich Bhaer
 1979 Women in White as Dr. Mike Rayburn
 1979 Mind Over Murder as Ben Kushing
 1980 The Yeagers as John David Yeager
 1980 The Mountain Men as Medicine Wolf
 1981 A Gun in the House as Joe Cates
 1982 The Sound of Murder as
 1982 Knots Landing as
 1982 Trapper John, M.D. as Dr. Frank Langtry
 1982 McClain's Law as
 1982 The Facts of Life as Major Dorsey
 1983 Cocaine: One Man's Seduction as Bruce Neumann
 1983 Deadly Lessons as John Ferrar
 1983 Dynasty as
 1983 Whiz Kids as Dave Kerns
 1983 When Your Lover Leaves as Joe Masterson
 1983 AfterMASH as Dr. Mark Boyer
 1984 The Sky's No Limit as
 1984 Hunter as Gus Trancus
 1984 Cover Up as Prescott
 1984 Riptide as
 1985 Hardcastle and McCormick as Eddie Dawson
 1985 Picking Up the Pieces as Dr. Eric Harding
 1985 St. Elsewhere as Col. Chuck Cochrane
 1986 The Nativity as
 1986 The Children of Times Square as Peter Roberts
 1986 Stark: Mirror Image as Kenneth Clayton
 1986 The Greatest Adventure: Stories from the Bible as Angel / Jesus Christ
 1986 Wildfire as John Cavanaugh / Prince Cavan 
 1986 The A-Team as Major Laskov
 1986 A Smoky Mountain Christmas as Video Director
 1987 Nutcracker: Money, Madness and Murder as Jones
 1987 Tales from the Hollywood Hills: Natica Jackson as
 1985-1987 Cagney & Lacey as Brian Cagney
 1987 Poor Little Rich Girl: The Barbara Hutton Story as Graham Mattison
 1988 Cagney & Lacey
 1988 Hotel as David Welch
 1988 Windmills of the Gods as
 1985-1988 MacGyver as Mr. Knapp
 1988 Memories of Me as 1st Assistant Director
 1988 Highway to Heaven as
 1988 The New Yogi Bear Show as
 1989 Studio 5-B as J.J. McMillan
 1989 A Peaceable Kingdom as Dr. Bartholomew Langley
 1990 Wrestling with God as Robert Owen
 1990 I Come in Peace as Inspector Switzer
 1991 History's Mysteries: Drake's Secret Voyage as 
 1991 Hell Hath No Fury as Stanley Ferguson
 1991 Stop at Nothing as Agent Conroy
 1992 Breaking the Silence as
 1992 The Fear Inside as Brandon Cole
 1992 The Round Table as
 1993 Dead On as
 1993 Love, Cheat & Steal as Tom Kerry
 1993 The New Adventures of Captain Planet as
 1986-1994 Murder, She Wrote as Bert Lown
 1994 Against the Wall as William Kunstler
 1994 Fortune Hunter as Paxton Leeds
 1994 Walker, Texas Ranger as Jess Morell
 1995 The Cosby Mysteries as 
 1996 Xena: Warrior Princess as Anteus
 1996 The Real Adventures of Jonny Quest as Ezekiel Rage
 1996 Raven as Bill Gilley
 1997 No Strings Attached as
 2000 Prison Life as

Self
 1998 In Search of History: The Heretic King
 1998 The Mysteries of Amelia Earhart
 1998 In Search of History: The First Americans
 1999 History's Mysteries: The First Detective
 1999 History's Mysteries: The Inquisition
 2000 History's Mysteries: Chain Gangs
 2000 History's Mysteries: Body Snatchers
 2000 Horror or Hoax
 2000 History's Mysteries: Ghost Plane of the Desert - Lady Be Good
 2000 History's Mysteries: Amityville -The Haunting
 2001 History's Mysteries: Vikings, Fury from the North
 2005 Meteors: Fire in the Sky
 2006 UFO Files: Alien Engineering
 2006 In Search of History: Dragons
 2007 The Universe

Archive footage
 2002 Intimate Portrait

References

External links
 

1940 births
Living people
Male actors from New Jersey
American male soap opera actors
American male stage actors
American male television actors
American male voice actors
People from East Orange, New Jersey
People from Wayne, New Jersey
20th-century American male actors
21st-century American male actors
Yale School of Drama alumni